Seán Walsh (3 April 1925 – 26 December 1989) was an Irish Fianna Fáil politician. He was an unsuccessful candidate at the 1961, 1965 and 1969 general elections. He was elected to the 12th Seanad at the 1969 Seanad election on the Labour Panel.

He was elected to Dáil Éireann as Fianna Fáil Teachta Dála (TD) for the Dublin County North constituency at the 1973 general election. He was re-elected at the 1977 general election for the Dublin County Mid constituency. From 1981 to 1989 he represented the Dublin South-West constituency. He lost his seat at the 1989 general election.

He died 6 months later on 26 December 1989.

References

1925 births
1989 deaths
Councillors of Dublin County Council
Fianna Fáil TDs
Members of the 12th Seanad
Members of the 20th Dáil
Members of the 21st Dáil
Members of the 22nd Dáil
Members of the 23rd Dáil
Members of the 24th Dáil
Members of the 25th Dáil
Politicians from County Dublin
Fianna Fáil senators